Jean-Louis Aubert (15 February 1731 in Paris – 10 November 1814 in Paris), called the Abbé Aubert, was a French dramatist, poet and journalist, son of the violinist and composer Jacques Aubert (1686-1753) and brother of Louis Aubert (painter). Aubert was educated at the Collège de Navarre and entered the order.
He opposed the encyclopedists.

Aubert published  in the Mercure de France and in 1756 . In 1773, he was made chair of literature at the Collège Royal and replaced Marin as director of the Gazette de France in 1774.

External links 
 Notice on abbé Aubert on Gallica

1731 births
1814 deaths
Writers from Paris
18th-century French dramatists and playwrights
19th-century French dramatists and playwrights
18th-century French journalists
18th-century French poets
French fabulists
University of Paris alumni
18th-century French male writers
Academic staff of the Collège de France
French abbots
18th-century essayists
19th-century French essayists
19th-century French male writers